KGCN may refer to:

 KGCN (FM), a radio station (91.7 FM) licensed under construction permit to Roswell, New Mexico, United States
 the ICAO code for Grand Canyon National Park Airport, in Coconio County, Arizona, United States